Jim Cole was a Welsh footballer who played as a full back in the Football League for Chester.

References

1925 births
1997 deaths
Footballers from Wrexham
Chester City F.C. players
Bolton Wanderers F.C. players
Association football fullbacks
English Football League players
Welsh footballers